Lotta på Liseberg (Lotta at Liseberg), also called Allsång på Liseberg (Sing-along at Liseberg), is a Swedish sing-along show held at Stora scenen at the amusement park Liseberg in Gothenburg every Monday evening during the summers since 2004, hosted by Lotta Engberg and conducted by Curt-Eric Holmquist, the pianist. It is produced by Eyeworks. Since 2009-2014 it has been broadcast by TV4.

Jul-Lotta på Liseberg
In December 2005 a winter sing-along show called Jul-Lotta på Liseberg (Christmas-Lotta at Liseberg) started ("Jul-Lotta"="Julotta + Lotta"). It has been broadcast by TV4 since 2011. The intro-song is "Hej, mitt vinterland" and the outro-song "O Holy Night" (O helga natt in Swedish). The show is broadcast on Sundays during the Christmas time and there are 4 programs.

See also
Allsång på Skansen

References

External links
Lotta på Liseberg on TV4's website
Lotta på Liseberg on Liseberg's website

Swedish music television series
Music in Gothenburg
2009 Swedish television series debuts
Recurring events established in 2004
Summer events in Sweden
Sing-along